Guardians of the Flame is the second album from New York power metal band Virgin Steele, released in 1983 by Music for Nations. Sanctuary reissued the album in 2002 with songs previously released in the EP Wait for the Night, a live recording, and an interview with the band.

Track listing

Personnel

Virgin Steele
David DeFeis - all vocals, keyboards, producer
Jack Starr - guitars
Joe O'Reilly - bass
Joey Ayvazian - drums

Production
Jerry Comito - engineer
Alvaro Falcon - engineer

References

1983 albums
Virgin Steele albums
Music for Nations albums
Roadrunner Records albums
King Records (Japan) albums